Cha Young-Hwan (born July 16, 1990) is a South Korean football player who plays as a defensive midfielder or centre-back for Yangju Citizen FC.

Club statistics
As of 3 December 2017

References

External links

Living people
South Korean footballers
South Korean expatriate footballers
J2 League players
Tochigi SC players
Zweigen Kanazawa players
Busan IPark players
Gimcheon Sangmu FC players
K League 1 players
K League 2 players
Expatriate footballers in Japan
South Korean expatriate sportspeople in Japan
1990 births
Association football midfielders